Mauges Communauté is a Communauté d'agglomération, an intercommunal structure, in the Maine-et-Loire department, in the Pays de la Loire region, western France. It was created in January 2016. Its seat is in Beaupréau-en-Mauges. Its area is 1314.6 km2. Its population was 120,590 in 2017.

Composition
The communauté d'agglomération consists of the following 6 communes:
Beaupréau-en-Mauges
Chemillé-en-Anjou
Mauges-sur-Loire
Montrevault-sur-Èvre
Orée-d'Anjou
Sèvremoine

References

Agglomeration communities in France
Intercommunalities of Maine-et-Loire